Davis is a village in Stephenson County, Illinois, United States. The population was 677 at the 2010 census, up from 662 in 2000.

History
Davis was founded in the 1850s when the railroad was extended to that point. The village was named for one of its founders, S. J. Davis. A post office has been in operation at Davis since 1858.

Geography

Davis is located at  (42.421216, -89.414683).

Demographics

As of the census of 2000, there were 662 people, 254 households, and 180 families residing in the village. The racial makeup of the village was 98.64% White, 0.30% African American, 0.15% Asian, 0.15% from other races, and 0.76% from two or more races. Hispanic or Latino of any race were 1.21% of the population.

There were 254 households, out of which 37.8% had children under the age of 18 living with them, 60.2% were married couples living together, 7.1% had a female householder with no husband present, and 29.1% were non-families. 26.0% of all households were made up of individuals, and 14.6% had someone living alone who was 65 years of age or older. The average household size was 2.61 and the average family size was 3.14.

In the village, the population was spread out, with 29.9% under the age of 18, 7.4% from 18 to 24, 29.5% from 25 to 44, 20.8% from 45 to 64, and 12.4% who were 65 years of age or older. The median age was 34 years. For every 100 females, there were 98.8 males. For every 100 females age 18 and over, there were 94.1 males.

The median income for a household in the village was $45,385, and the median income for a family was $51,538. Males had a median income of $38,971 versus $22,250 for females. The per capita income for the village was $18,595. About 3.8% of families and 7.1% of the population were below the poverty line, including 7.0% of those under age 18 and 9.7% of those age 65 or over.

References

Villages in Stephenson County, Illinois
Villages in Illinois